Nawalgarh Assembly constituency is one of constituencies of Rajasthan Legislative Assembly in the Jhunjhunu (Lok Sabha constituency).

Nawalgarh Constituency covers all voters from Nawalgarh tehsil.

Members of the Legislative Assembly

References

See also 
 Member of the Legislative Assembly (India)

Jhunjhunu district
Assembly constituencies of Rajasthan